Álex Mumbrú Murcia (born 12 June 1979) is a Spanish former professional basketball player and a professional basketball coach, who currently works as head coach for Valencia of the Spanish Liga ACB and the EuroLeague. He most recently worked for Surne Bilbao Basket as head coach. He was a 2.02 m (6' 7 ") tall small forward.

Professional career
Mumbrú began his career playing with Sant Josep Badalona of the Liga EBA, the farm team of Joventut in the 1997–98 and 1998–99 seasons, where he also played several games with Joventut's senior team in the Liga ACB. He then moved to Real Madrid before the 2002–03 season. He moved back to Joventut before the 2004–05 season.

He rejoined Real Madrid before the 2006–07 season. He then joined Bilbao Basket before the 2009–10 season. He retired from basketball in 2018. His number 15 was retired by Bilbao Basket on the 13th of April 2022 against former club Real Madrid in which he managed Bilbao to a victory.

On 14 June 2022 he signed a three-year contract as head coach with Valencia of the Spanish Liga ACB.

Spain national team
Mumbrú has played with the senior men's Spain national team that won the gold medal at the 2006 FIBA World Championship, the silver medal at the EuroBasket 2007, the silver medal at the 2008 Summer Olympics, and the gold medal at the EuroBasket 2009.

Prior to the EuroBasket 2011, the 32-year-old Mumbrú announced his retirement from the national team. However, he returned to represent Spain at the EuroBasket 2013.

References

External links
 Álex Mumbrú  at acb.com 
 Álex Mumbrú at eurobasket.com
 Álex Mumbrú at euroleague.net
 Álex Mumbrú at fiba.com
 Álex Mumbrú at fibaeurope.com
 

1979 births
Living people
2006 FIBA World Championship players
2010 FIBA World Championship players
Basketball players at the 2008 Summer Olympics
Basketball players from Barcelona
Basketball players from Catalonia
Bilbao Basket coaches
Bilbao Basket players
Competitors at the 2005 Mediterranean Games
FIBA World Championship-winning players
Joventut Badalona players
Liga ACB players
Medalists at the 2008 Summer Olympics
Mediterranean Games bronze medalists for Spain
Mediterranean Games medalists in basketball
Olympic basketball players of Spain
Olympic medalists in basketball
Olympic silver medalists for Spain
Power forwards (basketball)
Real Madrid Baloncesto players
Small forwards
Spanish basketball coaches
Spanish men's basketball players